Jon In-chan ( or  ) is the current ambassador of North Korea to countries in Scandinavia.

See also
 Foreign relations of North Korea
 Denmark–North Korea relations
 Iceland–North Korea relations
 North Korea–Norway relations
 North Korea–Sweden relations
 List of diplomatic missions of North Korea

References

Living people
Ambassadors of North Korea to Denmark
Ambassadors of North Korea to Finland
Ambassadors of North Korea to Norway
Ambassadors of North Korea to Sweden
Year of birth missing (living people)
Place of birth missing (living people)